The Ghavam (Qavam) family was one of the most influential Iranian families in the Qajar era (1785–1925). They were descendants of Haj Ebrahim Khan Kalantar. Many sources such as British secret documents and Nasser Al Din Shah Qajar himself believed that the family was Jewish. The family was so powerful with wealth and political power that it was often said in Shiraz "Before Reza Shah, Qavams were Shah here." The surname Ghavam is borrowed from honorific title Ghavam-al-saltaneh from Qajar court which means pillar or continuation of Kingdom.

Early years 
Ghavam family trace their ancestry back to Hajj Ghavam ol Din a 14th-century Vizier, and a contemporary of Hafez who is also mentioned in his poems. Local tradition always portray family as Jewish and this claim was confirmed in secret British memoirs of 1890s called Who's Who in Iran.

The first member of family to reach political influence was Hajj Ebrahim Kalantar Shirazi. He was a Vizier and Kalantar of Fars in Zand government and his decision to betray Lotf Ali Khan Zand was instrumental in ending Zand dynasty and bringing Qajars to the throne. Naser al-Din Shah Qajar Qajar famously addressed him when he met with the representatives of Alliance Israelite Universelle in Paris by saying 

However Fath Ali Shah Qajar did not trust Hajj Ebrahim and had him executed in 1801. His fourth son, Ali Akbar Khan, was very young and ill and was spared from Shah's revenge. He later returned to Shiraz and gained influence. He became the Kalantar of Fars by Fath Ali Shah in 1812. He was later awarded the title Qavam ol Mulk (Pillar of kingdom) in 1830 which became family's last name. In 1864 he became the administrator of Imam Reza shrine at Mashhad. Hajj Ali Akbar Khan was survived by his fourth son Ali Mohammad Khan who also inherited the title Ghavam ol Mulk. In total five members of the family held that title until it was abolished by Reza Shah in the 1930s. Ebrahim Khan, Ghavam ol Mulk V was exiled by Reza Shah to Tehran. Fath Ali Khan, Saheb Divan, another son of first Ghavam went to Tehran in 1830 and married a daughter of Fath Ali Shah and became influential in government. He became governor of many provinces. Nasir ol Mulk another son Ali Akbar Khan remained in Fars and served as governor of Bushehr, Lar and Bandar Abbas.

Thus there are three major branches of the Qavam family:
Ghavams, who are in Tehran and are sons and daughters of Ebrahim Ghavam
Ghavams, who are descendants of Nasir ol Mulk
 Saheb Divanis, who are descendants of Saheb Divan from Shiraz

The British did enjoy the loyalty of Ghavam family in Fars. Ahmad Ghavam, son of Ghavam Shiraz was an influential intermediary between the British and Reza Shah. He was often shuttled back and forth between the palace and the British embassy.

General Hussein Fardoust wrote in his memoirs that British staff often spent weekends in Ghavam's house and they were treated like members of his family. Ghavam's emissaries were often in movement between Shiraz, Tehran and the British embassy but for important decisions Ghavam himself often came to Tehran to meet with the British. For example, in August 1941 when Reza Shah was showing pro-Nazi views, Ghavam met with Sir Reader Bullard to decide the fate of the Shah. The decision to depose Reza Shah of the throne and put his son in place was made with the influence and the approval of the Ghavam.

Ebrahim Ghavam although exiled remained powerful and his son Ali Qavam married Princess Ashraf Pahlavi. However this marriage was forced upon Ashraf by Reza Shah in order to gain the favor of the British. When Iran was invaded by the allies, Ghavam tried to distance himself from the Pahlavi's. Their son Prince Shahram Pahlavi Nia was the grandson of both Reza Shah Pahlavi and Ebrahim Ghavam. Ali Ghavam later divorced Ashraf Pahlavi and married a sister of Asadollad Alam.

Many places were owned by this family such as: Ghavam Husseinya, Afif-Abad Garden, Delgosha Garden, Kalantar Garden, Biglerbeigi Garden, Zenatolmolok House, Narenjestan Qavam.

See also
 Ebrahim Kalantar Shirazi
 Mirza Abolhassan Khan Ilchi

References

Iranian families
Iranian people of Jewish descent
People of the Zand dynasty
Qavam family